Dorit S. Hochbaum is a professor of  industrial engineering and operations research at the University of California, Berkeley. She is known for her work on approximation algorithms, particularly for facility location, covering and packing problems, and scheduling, and on flow and cut algorithms, Markov random fields, image segmentation and clustering.

Education and career
Hochbaum earned her doctorate in 1979 from the Wharton School of the University of Pennsylvania, under the supervision of Marshall Lee Fisher. She was on the faculty of Carnegie Mellon University before moving to Berkeley in 1981. In 2011 she became the Epstein Family Professor of Industrial and Systems Engineering at the University of Southern California, but has since returned to Berkeley.

Recognition
In 2004, Hochbaum was awarded an honorary doctorate of sciences by the University of Copenhagen, recognizing her pioneering and inspiring contributions to mathematical optimization.  Hochbaum was awarded the title of INFORMS fellow in fall 2005 for the extent of her  contributions to operations research, management science and algorithm design. She is the winner of the 2011 INFORMS Computing Society prize for best paper dealing with the Operations Research/Computer Science interface. In 2014, she was selected as a fellow of the Society for Industrial and Applied Mathematics "for contributions to the design and analysis of approximation algorithms, flow problems, and their innovative use in applications, and in solving NP-hard problems."

References

External links
Home page

Year of birth missing (living people)
Living people
20th-century American mathematicians
21st-century American mathematicians
American women mathematicians
American operations researchers
UC Berkeley College of Engineering faculty
Fellows of the Society for Industrial and Applied Mathematics
Fellows of the Institute for Operations Research and the Management Sciences
20th-century women mathematicians
21st-century women mathematicians
20th-century American women
21st-century American women